Lee Yeong-duk (March 6, 1926 – February 6, 2010) was a South Korean politician. He served as Prime Minister from April 1994 to December of that year.

Lee died on February 6, 2010.

References

1926 births
2010 deaths
Deaths from pneumonia in South Korea
Seoul National University alumni
Ohio State University alumni